KWGL (105.7 FM, "The Range") is a radio station broadcasting a classic country music format. Licensed to Ouray, Colorado, United States.  The station is currently owned by Ws Communications, LLC.

History
The station was assigned the call letters KURA on 1985-02-28.  On 1999-03-01, the station changed its call sign to the current KWGL.

References

External links

WGL
Radio stations established in 1985
1985 establishments in Colorado